The National Portrait Gallery is a museum and portrait gallery located at Gripsholm Castle at Mariefred in Södermanland County, Sweden. It contains a collection of portraits of prominent Swedes.

History
The collection was first established by King Gustaf Vasa who had portraits hung in the newly built  Gripsholm Castle.
The National Portrait Gallery acquired the status of a national portrait gallery during the reign of King Gustav III. The collection also began to be expanded with non-royal persons. 
The National Portrait Gallery was officially founded in 1822 with over 4000 works that trace the portrait art changes from the 1500s to the present. Nationalmuseum has been responsible for the portrait collection since 1860. This arrangement has been periodically extended.
Each year the Gripsholm Society commissions and donates a portrait of an internationally prominent Swedish citizens to the collection. Many portraits are the work of prominent Swedish artists.

Notable portraits
Greta Garbo by Einar Nerman (1908) 
Dag Hammarskjöld by  Fritiof Schüldt  (1959) 
Birgit Nilsson  by Lasse Johnson (1963)
 Gunnar Myrdal by Sven Ljungberg (1968)
Ingmar Bergman by	Birgit Broms (1989)

References

External links
Porträttsamlingen website

Art museums and galleries in Sweden
Södermanland County
1822 establishments in Sweden
Museums established in 1822
Portrait galleries
Sweden Portrait